a Japanese original net animation series produced Zero-G. The series aired online in Japan between April 10, 2020 to June 26, 2020.

Characters

Production and release
The series was announced on November 3, 2019. It was animated by Zero-G and directed by Rensuke Oshikiri. Shun Tokuda edited and composited the animation, with the opening theme song "Catch Your Sweet Mind" performed by ORESAMA, who composed the music. Crunchyroll holds the license to stream the series in English. The series aired from April 10, 2020 to June 26, 2020. In Southeast Asia, the series was simulcasted in Southeast Asian countries on Aniplus Asia, in Hong Kong, Macau and Taiwan on Ani-One YouTube channel.

References

External links
 

2020 anime ONAs
Anime with original screenplays
Comedy anime and manga
Crunchyroll anime
Horror anime and manga
Zero-G (studio)